Marcos Eduardo Galperin (born October 31, 1971) is an Argentine billionaire businessman, who is best known as the co‑founder, Chairman, President and CEO of MercadoLibre. With an estimated net worth of 6.1 billion dollars, as of April 2021, he is the wealthiest person in Argentina.

Personal life 
Marcos Galperin was born in Buenos Aires, Argentina, to a wealthy family, owners of SADESA, one of the largest leather companies in the world. He attended Saint Andrew's Scots School in Olivos. In 1990, after graduating from high school, he traveled to the United States to study finance at The Wharton School of the University of Pennsylvania. There, he became friends with José Estenssoro, YPF president's son. In 1994, he joined this company when he finished college and returned to Argentina.

In 1997, he returned to the United States and he enrolled at Stanford Graduate School of Business and in 1999 he earned his M.B.A.

Career 
Marcos began the company while still in business school at Stanford University. Finance professor Jack McDonald had been helping Marcos to contact potential investors and asked John Muse, an invited speaker and co-founder of Hicks Muse, if Marcos could drive him to his private plane. Before boarding his plane, Muse expressed his desire to have his fund invest in the idea and soon thereafter the company started. MercadoLibre received funding from JPMorgan Partners, Flatiron Partners, Hicks Muse Tate and Furst, Goldman Sachs, GE Capital and Banco Santander Central Hispano. In September 2001 eBay acquired 19.5% of MercadoLibre in exchange for eBay's recently acquired Brazilian subsidiary of Ibazar.com.br. In this transaction, MercadoLibre also became eBay's exclusive partner for the Latin American region.

He is considered one of Argentina's internet entrepreneurs. As result of this he received a Konex Award in 2008 and a Platinum Konex Award in 2018 as the most important businessmen of the last decade in Argentina. In 1999, he was selected as an Endeavor Entrepreneur and currently serves its Argentina's Board of Directors. Endeavor is a global non-profit that selects and supports entrepreneurs in emerging markets. Additionally, he serves on the board of directors at Onapsis, in business application security, and is also an investor at COR, a project management tool that predicts and tracks profitability in real time.

In addition to his duties at MercadoLibre, Galperin also sat on the board of directors of Globant until 2020.

References

1971 births
Living people
Businesspeople from Buenos Aires
Stanford Graduate School of Business alumni
Argentine billionaires
University of Pennsylvania alumni